Giovanni Gallina (1 January 1892 – 1963) was an Italian footballer who played as a forward. He represented the Italy national football team twice, the first being on 11 January 1914, the occasion of a friendly match against Austria in a 0–0 home draw.

References

1892 births
1963 deaths
Italian footballers
Italy international footballers
Association football forwards
Casale F.B.C. players
Juventus F.C. players